The 1982 Mercedes Cup, was a men's tennis tournament played on outdoor clay courts and held at the Tennis Club Weissenhof in Stuttgart, West Germany that was part of the 1982 Grand Prix circuit. It was the fifth edition of the tournament and was held from 12 July until 18 July 1982. Unseeded Ramesh Krishnan won the singles title.

Finals

Singles

 Ramesh Krishnan defeated  Sandy Mayer, 5–7, 6–3, 6–3, 7–6
 It was Krishnan's 1st singles title of the year and the 2nd of his career.

Doubles

 Mark Edmondson /  Brian Teacher defeated  Andreas Maurer /  Wolfgang Popp, 6–3, 6–1

References

External links
 Official website 
 ITF tournament edition details
 ATP tournament profile

Stuttgart Open
Stuttgart Open
Mercedes Cup
Mercedes Cup